Law enforcement in Puerto Rico is one of three major components of the criminal justice system of Puerto Rico, along with courts and corrections. Although there exists an inherent interrelatedness between the different groups that make up the criminal justice system based on their crime deterrence purpose, each component operates independently from one another. However, the judiciary is vested with the power to make legal determinations regarding the conduct of the other two components.

Apart from maintaining order and service functions, the purpose of policing is the investigation of suspected criminal activity and the referral of the results of investigations and of suspected criminals to the courts. Law enforcement, to varying degrees at different levels of government and in different agencies, is also commonly charged with the responsibilities of deterring criminal activity and of preventing the successful commission of crimes in progress; the service and enforcement of warrants, writs and other orders of the courts.

Law enforcement agencies are also involved in providing first response to emergencies and other threats to public safety; the protection of certain public facilities and infrastructure; the maintenance of public order; the protection of public officials; and the operation of some correctional facilities (usually at the local level).

Agencies

 Commission on Safety and Public Protection
 Department of Justice
 FEI
 FURA
 Municipal Police
 National Guard
 Puerto Rico State Guard
 Natural Resources Ranger Corps
 Police
 Puerto Rico Law Enforcement Academy

Posts

 Adjutant General
 Attorney General
 Commissioner of Safety and Public Protection
 FEI
 Secretary of Justice
 Superintendent of the Puerto Rico Police

See also 
 Crime in Puerto Rico

Notes

References